Azem Bejta (10 December 1889 – 15 July 1924), commonly known as Azem Galica, was an Albanian nationalist and rebel who fought for the unification of Kosovo with Albania.

Biography

Early life
Azem Bejta was born in the village of Galica in the Vushtrri town of the Kosovo Vilayet, Ottoman Empire. He was the son of Bejta Galica, a rebel who died fighting against the Ottoman Empire and for Albania's separation from the Serbian state. Azem followed his father, and first fought against the Kingdom of Serbia in 1912.

Resistance against Serbia
Azem Galica was one of the leaders of armed resistance to Serbian rule in Kosovo in the years 1912–1914. With his Kacak fighters, he resisted Serbian forces that entered Kosovo during the Balkan Wars and early in World War I. In the winter of 1915–16, during World War I, Serbia was occupied by Bulgaria and Austria-Hungary after the Central Powers victory in Kosovo in later November 1915.

Bulgaria and Austria-Hungary
In 1915, after the Austro-Hungarian occupation of Kosovo following the rout of the Serbians, Azem Galica began an armed resistance against the new invaders. However, after persuasion by Luigj Gurakuqi, Prenk Bib Doda and Fejzi Alizoti, as well as the opening of 300 Albanian schools, the right to fly the Albanian flag, and assurances that the Austrians would respect the customs of the country, the Albanian language, and both the Christian and Muslim religions, Azem Galica accepted the Austrian occupation.

In 1918, the Serbian Army pushed the Central Powers out of Kosovo. After World War I ended, Kosovo found itself in the Kingdom of Serbs, Croats and Slovenians (later known as the Kingdom of Yugoslavia) on 1 December 1918. Galica again became an outlaw, fighting again the soldiers and police of the King.

Resistance against Yugoslavia

Disaffected Kosovar Albanians, who had rallied around Hasan Prishtina, formed a 'Committee for the National Defence of Kosovo' in Shkoder in 1918, their main demand being the unification of Kosovo with Albania. The best known of the Kachak leaders were Bajram Curri, Hasan Prishtina and Azem Galica. A general revolt started, known as the Kachak (outlaw) movement, led by Azem Galica, against the incorporation of Kosovo into Yugoslavia. Fighting blew up in Drenica, Azem Galica's home territory. It was estimated that there were 10,000 active rebels at this time.

His wife Qerime Radisheva, known as Shota Galica, fought alongside Azem Galica. They succeeded in creating a "free zone" in Galica (Azem's hometown) and 3 villages around, called "Arberia e Vogel" (little Arberia). The Yugoslav kingdom, however, had no intention of letting this zone survive, and with superior fire power and troop numbers they moved into Drenica. They succeeded in wounding Azem who later died from his wounds. His last wish was for his body not to be found by the Serbs, and thus he was buried in a deep cave somewhere near Drenica. He died on July 15, 1924.

Aftermath
The death of Galica dealt a mortal blow to the armed resistance against Yugoslav military presence in Kosovo, which he had led for the past eight years. The Yugoslavs intensified their repression of the Albanian movement in Kosovo.

Apart from some small groups which were never subdued, the end of the major Kacak resistance came when Yugoslav government helped Ahmed Zogu to return to power in Tirana in December 1924, in exchange for his suppressing the Committee for the National Defence of Kosovo.

Legacy
As a national hero, Galica epitomized the Albanian Kosovar resistance. In the long term, the killing of Galica and of many others stimulated, and set an example of, Albanian resistance against repression and inequality in Kosovo.

See also
 Kachak

Notes

References

1889 births
1924 deaths
Kosovo Albanians
19th-century Albanian military personnel
20th-century Albanian military personnel
Military personnel from Skenderaj
People from Kosovo vilayet
Albanian National Awakening
Military personnel killed in action
Albanian military personnel of World War I